Raikoke, also spelled Raykoke, is, as of 2019 a Russian uninhabited volcanic island near the centre of the Kuril Islands chain in the Sea of Okhotsk in the northwest Pacific Ocean,  distant from the island of Matua. Its name is derived from the Ainu language, from the Hokkaido Ainu word “hellmouth.”

Geology
The island is a stratovolcano, its lava composed primarily of basalt. The volcano has most recently erupted in 1765, 1778, 1924 and 2019. The 1778 and 1924 Raikoke eruptions were classified on the Volcanic Explosivity Index scale (that ranges from zero to eight) as VEI-4 or greater. For comparison the volcano Anak Krakatoa eruption in 2018 was also rated as a VEI-4 event. The 1778 eruption of Raikoke was the largest of the recent volcanic events destroying the upper third of the island. The only known fatalities from the eruptions was during the 1778 eruption when fifteen were killed from falling lava bombs.

2019 eruption

Fauna
Raikoke is one of five major Steller sea lion rookeries on the Kuril Islands and in the spring and summer it is home to one of the largest northern fulmar aggregations on the Kurils; crested and parakeet auklet, pigeon guillemot, and black-legged kittiwake also nest on the island. Captain Henry James Snow reported that in 1883 some 15,000 northern fur seals inhabited the island.  However, by the 1890s only "a few scores" were recorded captured there, almost certainly due to overexploitation by fur hunters.  Currently no fur seals reproduce on Raikoke.

History
Raikoke was visited by hunting and fishing parties of the Ainu, but there was no permanent habitation at the time of European contact. The island appears on an official map showing the territories of Matsumae Domain, a feudal domain of Edo Japan dated 1644, and these holdings were officially confirmed by the Tokugawa shogunate in 1715.  It was subsequently claimed by the Russian Empire; sovereignty initially passed to Russia under the terms of the Treaty of Shimoda, but was returned to the Empire of Japan per the Treaty of Saint Petersburg along with the rest of the Kuril islands.

The island was formerly administered as part of Shimushu District of Nemuro Subprefecture of Hokkaidō. After World War II, it came under the control of the Soviet Union, and is now administered as part of the Sakhalin Oblast of Russia.

See also
List of volcanoes in Russia

Notes

References 
 Global Volcanism Program

Further reading 
 Gorshkov, G. S. Volcanism and the Upper Mantle Investigations in the Kurile Island Arc. Monographs in geoscience. New York: Plenum Press, 1970. 
 Krasheninnikov, Stepan Petrovich, and James Greive. The History of Kamtschatka and the Kurilski Islands, with the Countries Adjacent. Chicago: Quadrangle Books, 1963.
 Rees, David. The Soviet Seizure of the Kuriles. New York: Praeger, 1985. 
 Takahashi, Hideki, and Masahiro Ōhara. Biodiversity and Biogeography of the Kuril Islands and Sakhalin. Bulletin of the Hokkaido University Museum, no. 2-. Sapporo, Japan: Hokkaido University Museum, 2004.

External links

 

Active volcanoes
Islands of the Sea of Okhotsk
Islands of the Russian Far East
Stratovolcanoes of Russia
Islands of the Kuril Islands
Uninhabited islands of Russia
Volcanoes of the Kuril Islands
Mountains of the Kuril Islands
Holocene stratovolcanoes